The year 1912 in science and technology involved some significant events, listed below.

Archaeology 

 December 6 – The Nefertiti bust is found  at Amarna in Egypt by the German Oriental Company (Deutsche Orient-Gesellschaft – DOG), led by German archaeologist Ludwig Borchardt.

Astronomy
 At the beginning of this year an extreme decadal variation in length of day produces mean solar days having a duration of 86400.00389 seconds of Terrestrial Time (or ephemeris time), the slowest rotation of Earth's crust ever to be recorded.

Biology
 July 23 – Horace Donisthorpe first discovers Anergates atratulus in the New Forest, England.
 Reginald Punnett is appointed as first Arthur Balfour Professor of Genetics in the University of Cambridge (U.K.), probably the oldest chair of genetics in the English-speaking world.

Chemistry
 Peter Debye derives the T-cubed law for the low temperature heat capacity of a nonmetallic solid.
 Casimir Funk introduces the concept of vitamins.
 Fritz Klatte, a German chemist working for Griesheim-Elektron, discovers polyvinyl acetate and applies for a patent for preparing the monomer, vinyl acetate, by addition of acetic acid to acetylene using a mercuric chloride catalyst although it is not successfully commercialized at this time.
 Wilbur Scoville devises the Scoville scale for measuring the heat of peppers.
 December 24 – Merck files patent applications for synthesis of the entactogenic drug MDMA, developed by Anton Köllisch.

Geology
 January – Alfred Wegener proposes a fully formulated theory of continental drift and gave the supercontinent Pangaea its name.
 June 6 – The Novarupta volcano on the Alaska Peninsula comes into being through a VEI 6 eruption, the largest this century.

Exploration
 January 17 – British polar explorer Robert Falcon Scott and a team of four reach the South Pole to find that Amundsen has beaten them to it. They will die on the return journey, just eleven miles from a polar base (March 16–29).
 March 7 – Roald Amundsen announces in Hobart that his expedition reached the South Pole on last December 14.

History of science
 November 20 – History of Medicine Society holds its first meeting, under the chairmanship of Sir William Osler, in London.
 Georgius Agricola's De re metallica (1556) is first published in an English translation, made by Herbert and Lou Henry Hoover, in London.
 Voynich manuscript discovered.

Mathematics
 Publication of the 2nd volume of Principia Mathematica by Alfred North Whitehead and Bertrand Russell, one of the most important and seminal works in mathematical logic and philosophy.
 Karl F. Sundman solves the n-body problem for n=3.

Medicine
 Harvey Cushing identifies Cushing's disease, caused by a malfunction of the pituitary gland.
 Solomon Carter Fuller first names Alzheimer's disease.
 Hakaru Hashimoto first describes the symptoms of Hashimoto's thyroiditis.

Metallurgy
 Krupp engineers Benno Strauss and Eduard Maurer patent austenitic stainless steel (October 17) and Elwood Haynes (in the United States) and Harry Brearley (of Brown-Firth in Sheffield, England) independently discover martensitic stainless steel alloys.

Meteorology
 April 5 – Milutin Milanković’s Contribution to the mathematical theory of climate, his first work in this field, is published in Belgrade.

Paleontology
 December 18 – Skull of "Piltdown Man" presented to the Geological Society of London as the fossilised remains of a previously unknown form of early human. It is revealed to be a hoax in 1953.

Physics
 November 11 – William Lawrence Bragg presents his derivation of Bragg's law for the angles for coherent and incoherent scattering from a crystal lattice.
 Max von Laue suggests using crystal lattices to diffract X-rays.
 Walter Friedrich and Paul Knipping diffract X-rays in zinc blende.
 Victor Hess discovers that the ionization of air increases with altitude, indicating the existence of cosmic radiation.

Psychology
 Carl Jung publishes Wandlungen und Symbole der Libido (Psychology of the Unconscious), based on lectures delivered at Fordham University and precipitating a break with Sigmund Freud.
 Sabina Spielrein delivers her paper on "Destruction as the Cause of Coming Into Being" to the Vienna Psychoanalytic Society.

Technology
 April 14–15 – Sinking of the RMS Titanic: The ocean liner  strikes an iceberg and sinks on her maiden voyage from the United Kingdom to the United States.
 The British Royal Navy introduces the director ship gun fire-control system using the Dreyer Table, a mechanical analogue computer.
 The Sperry Corporation develops the first gyroscopic autopilot ("gyroscopic stabilizer apparatus") for aviation use.
 The earth inductor compass is first patented by Donald M. Bliss.

Other events
 American ornithologist Robert Ridgway publishes Color Standards and Color Nomenclature.
 Conférence internationale de l'heure radiotélégraphique.
 First International Congress of Eugenics held in London with the support of Leonard Darwin, Winston Churchill, Auguste Forel, Alexander Graham Bell, Charles Davenport and other prominent scientists.

Awards
 Nobel Prize
 Physics – Nils Gustaf Dalén
 Chemistry – Victor Grignard; Paul Sabatier
 Medicine – Alexis Carrel

Births
 January 21 – Konrad Emil Bloch (died 2000), German-born biochemist, winner of the Nobel Prize in Physiology or Medicine.
 January 27 – Francis Rogallo (died 2009), American aeronautical engineer.
 January 30 – Werner Hartmann (died 1988), German physicist.
 February 13 – Natan Yavlinsky (died 1962), Russian nuclear physicist.
 February 25 – Preben von Magnus (died 1973), Danish virologist.
 March 1 – Boris Chertok (died 2011), Russian rocket designer.
 March 19 – Bill Frankland (died 2020), English immunologist.
 March 23 – Wernher von Braun (died 1977), German-born physicist and engineer.
 April 19 – Glenn T. Seaborg (died 1999), American physical chemist, winner of the Nobel Prize in Chemistry.
 May 22 – Herbert C. Brown (died 2004), English-born chemist, winner of the Nobel Prize in Chemistry.
 May 28 – Ruby Payne-Scott (died 1981), Australian radioastronomer.
 May 30 – Julius Axelrod (died 2004), American biochemist, winner of the Nobel Prize in Physiology or Medicine.
 May 31 – Chien-Shiung Wu (died 1997), Chinese-American nuclear physicist, winner of the Wolf Prize in Physics.
 June 23 – Alan Turing (died 1954), English computer scientist.
 June 30 – Ludwig Bölkow (died 2003), German aeronautical engineer.
 August 11 – Norman Levinson (died 1975), American mathematician.
 August 13 – Salvador Luria (died 1991), Italian-born biologist, winner of the Nobel Prize in Physiology or Medicine.
 August 30 – Edward Mills Purcell (died 1997), American physicist, winner of the Nobel Prize in Physics.
 September 7 – David Packard (died 1996), American electronics engineer.
 September 22 – Herbert Mataré (died 2011), German physicist.
 October 1 – Kathleen Ollerenshaw (died 2014), English mathematician.
 November 14 – Tung-Yen Lin (died 2003), Chinese-born civil engineer.
 November 19 – George Emil Palade (died 2008), Romanian-born microbiologist, winner of the Nobel Prize in Physiology or Medicine.
 November 22 – Paul Zamecnik (died 2009), American scientist playing a central role in the early history of molecular biology.

Deaths
 February 10 – Joseph Lister (born 1827), English inventor of antiseptic.
 February 12 – Osborne Reynolds (born 1842), British physicist.
 March 19 – Thomas Harrison Montgomery, Jr. (born 1873), American zoologist and cell biologist.
 March 28 – Paul-Émile Lecoq de Boisbaudran (born 1838), French chemist.
 March 29
 Robert Falcon Scott (born 1868), English Antarctic explorer.
 Edward Wilson (born 1872), English physician and naturalist.
 April 18 – Martha Ripley  (born 1843), American physician.
 May 4 – Nettie Stevens (born 1861), American geneticist.
 May 30 – Wilbur Wright (born 1867), American aviation pioneer.
 July 17 – Henri Poincaré (born 1854), French mathematician.
 August 7 – François-Alphonse Forel (born 1841), Swiss pioneer of limnology.
 November 23 – Charles Bourseul (born 1829), French telegraph engineer.
 December 17 – Spiru Haret (born 1851), Romanian mathematician, astronomer and politician.
 December 21 – Paul Gordan (born 1837), German Jewish mathematician, "the king of invariant theory".

References

 
20th century in science
1910s in science